Payson High School may refer to 

Payson High School (Arizona)
Payson High School (Utah)
Seymour High School (Illinois) is also known as Payson-Seymour High School, located in Payson, Illinois